Valeri Mikhailovich Tretyakov (born August 16, 1945) is a Russian professional football coach and a former player. In 2009, he managed FC Metallurg Lipetsk.

External links
 Career summary at KLISF

1945 births
Living people
Soviet footballers
Soviet football managers
FC Metallurg Lipetsk managers
Russian football managers
FC Metallurg Lipetsk players
FC Mordovia Saransk managers
FC Torpedo NN Nizhny Novgorod players
Association football midfielders